The 1955 Oklahoma Sooners football team was an American football team that represented the University of Oklahoma in the Big Seven Conference (Big 7) during the 1955 college football season. Led by ninth-year head coach Bud Wilkinson, the Sooners compiled an 11–0 record, outscored opponents by a total of 385 to 60, won the Big 7 and national championships, and defeated No. 3 Maryland, 20–6, in the 1956 Orange Bowl. In the Orange Bowl, Oklahoma trailed by six at halftime, and then outscored Maryland, 20–0, in the second half. Oklahoma's 1955 season was the school's tenth consecutive conference championship and part of a record-setting 47-game winning streak that lasted from October 10, 1953, through November 9, 1957.

The Sooners played their home games at Owen Field in Norman, Oklahoma.

National championship
In the final AP Poll released on November 28, 1955, Oklahoma was ranked No. 1 with 3,581 points, more than 300 points ahead of No. 2 Michigan State. The Sooners also finished with the No. 1 ranking in the final UPI coaches poll. The team was also recognized as the 1955 national champion in rankings and analyses issued by Berryman (QPRS), Billingsley Report, College Football Researchers Association, DeVold System, Dunkel System, Football Writers Association of America, Helms Athletic Foundation, International News Service, Litkenhous, National Championship Foundation, Poling System, Sagarin Ratings, and Williamson System.

Honors and statistical leaders
Guard Bo Bolinger was a consensus first-team pick on the 1955 All-America college football team.

Halfback Tommy McDonald led the team with 102 points scored, 715 rushing yards, and 284 passing yards.  McDonald received first-team All-America honors from the Associated Press. 

Three of the coaches and two of the players on the 1955 Sooners were later inducted into the College Football Hall of Fame: coach Wilkinson (inducted 1969); assistant coach Gomer Jones (inducted 1978); Tommy McDonald (inducted 1985); assistant coach Pete Elliott (inducted 1994); and center Jerry Tubbs (inducted 1996).

Schedule

Personnel

Players

 Bo Bolinger, guard
 Bob Burris, back
 Gene Cockrell, tackle
 Robert Derrick
 Carl Dodd
 Tom Emerson, tackle
 Ed Gray, end 
 Jimmy Harris, quarterback
 Bill Krisher, guard
 Tommy McDonald, halback
 Joe Mobra, end
 Cecil Morris
 Dennit Morris, linebacker
 Jay O'Neal
 Billy Pricer, back
 Don Stiller, end/guard
 Clendon Thomas, halfback
 Jerry Tubbs, center

Coaches
 Head coach - Bud Wilkinson
 Assistant coaches - Pete Elliott, Gomer Jones, Sam Lyle

Rankings

NFL Draft
The following players were selected in the 1955 NFL Draft following the season.

References

Oklahoma
Oklahoma Sooners football seasons
College football national champions
Big Eight Conference football champion seasons
Orange Bowl champion seasons
College football undefeated seasons
Oklahoma Sooners football